An abacus is a counting frame.

Abacus may also refer to:

 Abacus (architecture), a flat slab forming the uppermost member or division of the capital of a column
 Abacus (journal), a peer-reviewed academic accounting journal
 Abacus school, a type of Renaissance-era Italian trade school
 Logical abacus, an early mechanical digital computer
 Mental abacus, a system involving visualization of an abacus to carry out arithmetical calculations
 Abacus Harmonicus, an ancient diagram showing the structure and placement of the keys of a particular musical instrument
 Operation Abacus, the Canadian military operation to restore vital services if the year 2000 caused disruption

Companies and brands
Abacus Federal Savings Bank, an overseas Chinese bank in the United States 
Abacus: Small Enough to Jail, 2016 documentary about the bank, which was the only financial institution to face criminal charges following the subprime mortgage crisis
Abacus Data, a Canadian polling firm
Abacus 5, an action sports manufacturing and distribution company headquartered in Shanghai
ABACUS, an Enterprise Architecture (EA) mapping software tool by Avolution
Abacus, an imprint of Little, Brown and Company
Abacus Recordings, a defunct imprint of Century Media Records
Abacus Jasper's Management Group, owned by chef Kent Rathbun

es:Ábaco (desambiguación)
eo:Abako
eu:Abako (argipena)
fr:Abaque
gl:Ábaco (homónimos)
io:Abako (homonimo)
it:Abaco (disambigua)